Fratia is a monotypic genus of crustaceans belonging to the monotypic family Fratiidae. The only species is Fratia gaditana.

The species is found in Spain.

References

Cyclopoida